Oğuzhan Bahadır (born December 24, 1979 in Ankara) is a Turkish football goalkeeper who plays for Kırklarelispor.

References

External links
 
 Guardian Stats Centre

1979 births
Living people
Turkish footballers
Konyaspor footballers
İstanbul Başakşehir F.K. players
Süper Lig players
Footballers from Ankara
TFF First League players
Association football goalkeepers